Catoctin Mountain, along with the geologically associated Bull Run Mountains, forms the easternmost mountain ridge of the Blue Ridge Mountains, which are in turn a part of the Appalachian Mountains range. The ridge runs northeast–southwest for about  departing from South Mountain near Emmitsburg, Maryland, and running south past Leesburg, Virginia, where it disappears into the Piedmont in a series of low-lying hills near New Baltimore, Virginia. The ridge forms the eastern rampart of the Loudoun and Middletown valleys.

Geography
Catoctin Mountain traverses Frederick County, Maryland, and extends into northern Loudoun County, Virginia.

From its northern terminus in Maryland headed south, the range is composed mainly of a single north–south running ridge with periodic low-lying gaps, though it does contain several spur ridges, most notably near its intersection with South Mountain at its northern terminus. Its ridge character continues south of the Potomac in northern Loudoun County, losing elevation, until just north of Leesburg, where the range widens into a broad plateau of undulating hills separated by deep stream valleys. The range reaches its widest point north of Goose Creek at nearly three miles. South of the creek the Catoctin vanishes into the Piedmont countryside near the northern terminus of the Bull Run Mountains at Aldie.

Recreation
A number of federal, state, local, and private protected lands are located on Catoctin Mountain including the Emmitsburg Reservoir, Catoctin Mountain Park, Cunningham Falls State Park, the Frederick Municipal Forest, Gambrill State Park, the Chesapeake and Ohio Canal National Historical Park, all in Maryland, and the Morven Park estate in Virginia.

The trail, which is maintained by the Potomac Appalachian Trail Club, starts at Gambrill State Park, which also contains several shorter hiking and mountain biking trails as well as picnic pavilions, and continues north through the Frederick Municipal Forest to Cunningham Falls State Park and Catoctin Mountain Park. Both parks contain many shorter hiking trails and organized campgrounds.

The Journey Through Hallowed Ground Byway, a National Scenic Byway, loops and weaves through the northern part of the range.

Names
The name of Catoctin Mountain follows the convention of referring to an entire mountainous ridge as a single "mountain" in situations where there is no single prominent peak. Nevertheless, it is still occasionally (and erroneously) called the "Catoctin Mountains." However, the ridge clearly has two prominent segments, one south of the Potomac River in Virginia and one north of it in Maryland.

According to the USGS, variant names of Catoctin Mountain have included Kittochiny Mountains, Kittockton Mountain, Kittocton Mountain, and South Mountain. However, in Maryland, South Mountain and Catoctin Mountain are separate, roughly parallel, mountains.

The portion of the ridge directly west of Frederick, Maryland, is known locally as Braddock Mountain, and is signed as such where Interstate 70 crosses its summit, although the name is not recorded in the federal Geographic Names Information System. (The GNIS does, however, recognize the community of Braddock Heights, which is located there.)

Geology
The mountain, like much of the Blue Ridge/South Mountain in the immediate area, consists of Proterozoic Catoctin metabasaltic greenstone interspersed by metasedimentary white quartz and other phyllites and Precambrian basalt flows. The greenstone was originally formed about 570 million years ago as part of the rifting of the super-continent, Rodinia. The greenstone was later uplifted during the Alleghenian Orogeny and thrust westward, being interspersed with the sedimentary rock deposited during the Paleozoic era.

Flora and fauna

Much of the mountain, being shattered rock, is home to large populations of timber rattlesnakes. There are also black bears, turkeys, and deer, as well as vultures and raptors.

History
The name Catoctin probably derives from the Kittoctons, an American Indian tribe or clan which once lived between the mountain and the Potomac River; a local tradition asserts that Catoctin means "place of many deer" in an Indian language.

Catoctin Mountain is perhaps best known as the site of Camp David, a mountain retreat for presidents of the United States. It was first used by President Franklin D. Roosevelt in the 1930s, who called it "Shangri-La." In the 1950s, President Dwight Eisenhower renamed it Camp David, after his grandson David Eisenhower. The resort is extremely well guarded by the United States Secret Service, and only approved guests of the President are allowed into the retreat. Due to its proximity to Washington, D.C., and its beautiful mountain scenery, Camp David has proven to be a popular weekend "getaway" for many United States presidents, and approximately one-third of Catoctin Mountain Park can be closed to the public on short notice.

References

External links

 National Park Service.gov: Catoctin Mountain Park
 Maryland Scenic Byways: Catoctin Mountain Byway 
 Washington Post.com: "When Iron Was Hot in Loudoun County"
 

Mountain ranges of Maryland
Mountain ranges of Virginia
Blue Ridge Mountains
Landforms of Frederick County, Maryland
Landforms of Loudoun County, Virginia
Ridges of Maryland
Ridges of Virginia